750 Motor Club is a motor racing club in the UK. It was founded in 1939 to promote the sporting use of the Austin 7. '750' refers to the near-750cc Austin 7 engine. It later led to racing and the 750 Formula where specials are raced. Famous members include Colin Chapman, Eric Broadley, Adrian Reynard, Arthur Mallock, Derek Bennett, Tony Southgate, Brian Hart, Gordon Murray, Jem Marsh, Frank Costin and Mike Pilbeam. These engineers and designers produced the first Lotus, Lola, Chevron, Speedex, Marcos, Pilbeam and other sports and racing cars between the 1940s and 1960s.

The 750MC has continued to promote competitive, low-cost racing for enthusiasts, with a range of championships for production and racing sports cars, saloons and single-seaters.

Series and Championships

750 Formula Championship

The world's oldest sports prototype formula, with all cars using the 1.1 litre Fiat FIRE engine. There are three classes:
Class A: All competitors compete in this category.
Class B: Drivers who have not finished on the podium, in the top six in Class A, or won the Class B title in the last five years.
Class C: For college-entered teams.
-
750 Formula is the longest running championship in the world, beginning in 1949.

Championship results

Alfa Romeo Championship
Joining the club in 2020, the Alfa Romeo Championship caters for all types of the marques cars, classified in three categories - Modified, Power Trophy and Twin Spark Cup.

Championship results

Armed Forces Race Challenge
Primarily a motor racing community for Service personnel and veterans, AFRC rewards consistency as well as outright pace and achieved championship status in 2017.

Bikesports Championship
A championship for sports-racing cars using production motorcycle 4-stroke engines, with their standard transmissions. There are currently three classes:
Class A: Cars using 'tuned' motorbike engines up to 1500cc (different weight limits apply based on capacity)
Class B: Cars using 'production' motorbike engines up to 1500cc (different weight limits apply based on capacity)
Class C: Cars using motorbike engines up to 1100cc

Championship results

Birkett Relay
A six-hour relay event where competitors race for scratch and handicap positions, open to sports cars and saloon cars. The race was first run in 1951, and was created by Holland Birkett, who was one of the founding members of the 750 Motor Club. In 2001, a twelve-hour race was also held. Currently, the event is held at the Silverstone Circuit on the full Historic GP layout.

Results

Scratch winners:
 2021 - RJ Motorsport with Daytona (Alistair Smart, Simon Freeman, Charles Graham)
 2020 - Raw Motorsport (John MacLeod, Shane Stoney, Tom Ashton)
 2019 - Breakell Racing Heroes (Wade Eastwood, Charles Graham, Luciano Bacheta)
 2018 – Cupra Racing (Carl Swift, Shayne Deegan, Stewart Lines, Lee Deegan)
 2017 – Dobbers (Thomas Harvey, Brian Harvey, John Macleod)
 2016 – We Don't Like Second (Aaron Bailey, Doug Carter, Brian Murphy, Simon Garmston, Lee Bailey)
 2015 – Inspires (Tim Gray, John Cutmore, Richard Wise, Alistair Boulton)
 2014 – The Winning Radicals (Aaron Bailey, Doug Carter, Brian Murphy, Lee Bailey and John Macleod)
 2013 – The Third Radicals (Aaron Bailey, Oliver Cox, Doug Carter, Charles Harvey-Kelly and Lee Bailey)
 2012 – Team O'BR (Mark Burton, Paul Rose, Graham Pattle, Graham Booth and Eugene O'Brien)
 2011 – IVOLT/Radical (Manhal Allos, Mark Smithson and Phil Abbott)
 2010 – Nearly Six Sevens (Peter Ratcliffe, Chris Porritt, Keith Dunn, Kevin Williams and Ian Wale)
 2009 – Geoff Steel Racing (Jamie Martin, Michael Symons, Keith Webster and Peter Moulsdale)
 2008 – Hart Attacks (Chris Hart, Barry Webb, Mike Evans, Jamie Champkin and Michelle Hayward)
 2007 – Gold Arts (Doug Newman, Simon Harris, John Schneider and Patrick Gormely)
 2006 – Gold Arts (Doug Newman, Simon Harris, Graham Booth and John Schneider)
 2005 – Gold Arts (Doug Newman, Simon Harris, Graham Booth and John Schneider)
 2004 – Glenn Racing (J.Taylor, S.Leighton, S.Hopkins, R.Gomes, B. Simpson and M. Simpson) 
 2003 – Glenn Racing (J.Taylor, S.Leighton, S.Hopkins, R.Gomes, B. Simpson and M. Simpson) 
 2002 – Woody's Wonders (J.Woodward, M.Fry, S.Maurer, D.Pegley and R. Mayers
 2001 - The Hart Attacks (Clive Woodward, Peter Richings, Paul Freeman, Howard Payne, Daniel Eagling and Glenn Eagling)
 2000 - Extremely Radical Racers (Robert Oldershaw Jnr, Robert Oldershaw Snr, David Tinn, Andrew Middleton, Stuart Woodcock and Steven Woodcock)

Handicap winners:
 2021 - RAF Motorsport (Alexander Smith, David Russell, Simon Frowen, Dan Smith)
 2020 - The Three Amigos 3.0 (Paul Hinson, David Drinkwater, Adam Read)
 2019 - The Three Amigos 2.0 (Paul Hinson, David Drinkwater, Adam Read)
 2018 – Red Rascal (Chris Lovett, Russell Clarke, Kenny Coleman, Kevin Dengate, Jamie Ingram, Reece Jones)
 2017 – RAF MSA (Chris Slator, Darren Howe, Scott Lawson, Ed McKean, Dan Smith)
 2016 – Carbon8 Coupe Cup B (Will Taylforth, Alex Cursley, Simon Miles)
 2015 – Team Owens (Will Schryver, Steve Laidlaw, Carl Swift, Endaf Owens)
 2014 – Six Signatures (Jim Needham, Kurt Brady, John Toshack, Spencer Horgan, David Rowe)
 2013 - Regency / TBR (Tom Bell, Nathan Saunders, Lee Deegan, Shayne Deegan)
 2012 - Dirty Half Dozen (Danny Cassar, Steve Cassar, Garry Barlow, Ashley Collins, Alan Yearley, Alex Hughes)
 2011 - RAFMSA Team Flywheel (Ian Fletcher, Darren Berris, Chris Slator, Darren Howe, Ed Fuller)
 2010 - OX4R (Gavin Bristow, Chris Oakman, James Loukes, Steve Liquorish, Mark Harrison)
 2009 - The Six Potters (Gail Hill, Chris Boon, David Bye, Peter Dorlin, Matt Skelton, Richard Dorlin)
 2008 - RAF MSA Help For Heroes (Brian Watson, Gareth Nutley, Jason Lappin, Steve Platts, Simon Wing, John Holmes)
 2007 - RAF MSA Flywheel (Ian Fletcher, Martyn Ashley, Simon Hutchinson, Darren Berris, Paul Martin Jones)
 2006 - Ecurie Porumphorganda (Ken Davies, Julian Gammage, Joe Henderson, Paul Aslett, Richard Thorne, Matthew Hammond)
 2005 - The Four DBL's (Tom Smith, James Cottingham, Michael Johnson, Bob Luff)

BMW Car Club Racing
BMW Car Club Racing (BMWCCR) began in 2018 and is for club-level BMW racers. There is championship status for 2019 and classes catering for all four-cylinder, six-cylinder and differing levels of M-powered cars. BMWCCR is also backed by the BMW Car Club GB.

Championship results

Classic Stock Hatch Championship
A longstanding formula for  multi-valve, or  8-valve engined hatchbacks. All cars models must have been produced prior to January 1992.

Championship winners

Prior to 2012, pre '92 cars ran as Stock Hatch Class B.

Stock Hatch
The Stock Hatch Championship ran to the same rule set but allowed in newer cars and came to an end in 2016 after a long, successful history with the club – attracting over 100 registrations in its prime with the Citroën Saxo generally being the car of choice.

Clio Sport Championship
A one-make championship for the Renault Clio 182, 197 and 200 models.

Championship Results

From 2015 to 2021, the championship was solely the Clio 182 Championship.

Club Enduro Championship
An endurance racing championship designed with the club-level competitor and budget in mind. Races are usually two or three hours long, with at least one mandatory three-minute pitstop to allow re-fuelling. Three classes separated by power to weight allow the vast majority of cars to be eligible, with outputs monitored by 750MC's own mobile rolling road.
Class A: Up to 300 bhp/tonne (power at flywheel, weight without driver).
Class B: Up to 240 bhp/tonne (power at flywheel, weight without driver).
Class C: Up to 180 bhp/tonne (power at flywheel, weight without driver).

The endurance race series for production sports and saloon cars began as a series in 2016, after a trial race in Snetterton the previous year and gained MSA Championship status in 2018, boasting some of the biggest grids in the UK.

2015 trial race

2016 season

Results

2017 season

Results

2018 season

Results

Championship points

2019 season

Results

Championship points

2020 season

Results

Championship points

2021 season

Results

Championship points

2022 season

Results

Championship points

F1000
The championship previously known as Formula Jedi joined the 750 Motor Club in 2019 and has established itself as the premier bike-engined, single-seater category in the UK and provides some of the fastest lap times in the country. Using a proven ‘slicks and wings’ racing car with excellent handling characteristics and powered by a 1000cc high performance motorbike engine, the cars reach 60 mph in just 3 seconds and go on to 150 mph, while revving to around 14000rpm.

Championship results

Formula Vee Championship
The most cost-effective introduction into single-seater racing; Formula Vee cars utilise  Volkswagen Beetle components, in single-seater chassis – often converted from Formula Ford units.

Championship results

Historic 750 Formula
This is a historic racing series catering for the previous two generations of 750 Formula cars, such as Austin Seven specials and Reliant-engined models, plus other small capacity racers  Formula 3 cars, amongst others.

Hot Hatch Championship
A formula for almost any naturally aspirated 2WD hatchback or hatchback-coupe. Re-launched in 2016 to follow on from the original, but now with power-to-weight rather than capacity class limits to ensure costs are tightly controlled.

Class rules were updated for 2021.

Class A: Up to 200 bhp/tonne (power at flywheel, weight with driver).
Class B: Up to 175 bhp/tonne (power at flywheel, weight with driver).
Class C: Up to 145 bhp/tonne (power at flywheel, weight with driver).

Championship results

Locost Championship

A one-make championship for the DIY sports car Locost using the design from Ron Champion's book "Build Your Own Sports Car" . All cars use the  Ford Crossflow engine mated to a 4-speed Escort or 4/5-speed Sierra Type 9 gearbox.

Championship results

Ma7da Locost
New in 2019, Ma7da Locost is an offshoot of the eternally popular Locost Championship for kit cars designed to the original Ron Champion ‘Build Your Own Sports Car’ book dimensions but featuring a 1.8-litre Mazda MX-5 engine.

Championship results

MR2 Championship
A one-make championship for Toyota MR2 sports cars. There are two titles at stake for each driver, one for the overall results and one for the different classes:
Class A: First-generation Toyota MR2s, fitted with the Toyota 4A-GE engine.
Class B: Second-generation Toyota MR2s, fitted with the Toyota 3S-GE engine.
Class C: Third-generation Toyota MR2s (and MR-S), fitted with the Toyota 1ZZ-FE engine.

Championship results

MX-5 Cup
5 Club Racing was formed in 2014 and joined the 750 Motor Club to run the MX5 Cup for Mk1 Mazda MX5s. The series became a championship in 2015.

Championship results

RGB Sports 1000 Championship
Formerly known as simply 'RGB' (Roadgoing Bike-engined), the highly competitive championship was re-launched in 2018 to reflect what the cars had developed into over the years. Namely 'Motorsport's Most Affordable Sports-Racing Car Championship.' Cars use 1000cc motorcycle-engines but run semi-slick trackday tyres, with no wings allowed. Lap times showcase BTCC pace at most circuits.

Championship results

Roadsports
The Roadsports series is a mini-enduro series for production-based, sports and saloon cars fitted with production engines from the same manufacturer. There are four classes, with A, B and C aligned with Club Enduro:
Class A: Up to 300 bhp/tonne (power at flywheel, weight without driver).
Class B: Up to 240 bhp/tonne (power at flywheel, weight without driver).
Class C: Up to 180 bhp/tonne (power at flywheel, weight without driver).
Class D: Up to 145 bhp/tonne (power at flywheel, weight without driver).

Sport Specials Championship
Relaunched in 2012 and previously known as the Kit Car Championship, until 2015 all cars were originally road legal, however this necessity was dropped in 2015 (see regulations ) to encourage more competitors. The championship caters for all manner of kit-type cars with production car powerplants, from Caterhams, Westfields and Sylva Sports Cars to home-developed one-offs.
After a class system restructure in 2017, there are two main classes, plus a third for MX150R models:
Class A: Up to 340 bhp/tonne (power at flywheel, weight with driver).
Class B: Up to 270 bhp/tonne (power at flywheel, weight with driver).
Class C: For MX150R kit cars

Championship Results

Type R Trophy
New in 2019, a series for Honda Civic Type-R's with limited modifications.

Championship results

116 Trophy
New in 2019, a one-make endurance series for the BMW 1 Series, using donor E87 aka "Mk 1" road cars. Only changes to ECU map, tyres, dampers, and roll cage are required.

2014
Champions:

 750 Formula – Billy Albone
 Bikesports – Adrian Reynard
 Compact Cup – Stuart Voyce
 Classic Stock Hatch – Lee Scott
 Formula Vee – Martin Farmer
 Locost – Matthew Brooks
 MR2 Championship – Matt Palmer
 RGB – Matt Higginson
 Sport Specials – Paul Boyd
 Stock Hatch – Shayne Deegan

2015
Champions:

 750 Formula – David Bartholomew
 Bikesports – Tim Gray
 Classic Stock Hatch – Matt Rozier
 Clio 182 – James Bark
 Civic Cup – Adam Shepherd
 Compact Cup – Steve Roberts
 Formula Vee – Paul Smith
 Locost – Danny Andrew
 MR2 – Shaun Traynor
 MX5 Cup – Ben Short
 RGB – Scott Mittell
 Sport Specials – Adrian Cooper
 Stock Hatch – Shayne Deegan

2016
Champions:

 750 Formula – Robin Gearing
 Bikesports – Phil Knibb
 Classic Stock Hatch – Matt Rozier
 Clio 182 – Patrick Fletcher
 Civic Cup – Class A: David Buky, Class B: Carl Swift
 Formula Vee – Paul Smith
 Locost – Ian Allee
 MR2 – Jim Davies
 MX5 – Will Blackwell-Chambers
 RGB – Matt Higginson
 Sport Specials – Matthew Booth
 Stock Hatch – Ryan Polley

2017
Champions:

 750 Formula – Bill Cowley
 Bikesports – Stefano Leaney
 Classic Stock Hatch – Lee Scott
 Clio 182 – Patrick Fletcher
 Civic Cup – Class A: Lee Deegan
 Formula Vee – Ben Miloudi
 Locost – Ian Allee
 MR2 – Shaun Traynor
 MX5 – Ben Short
 RGB – Billy Albone
 Sport Specials – Paul Boyd
 Hot Hatch – Paul Jarvis
 Armed Forces Race Challenge – Paul Waterhouse
 M3 Cup – Adam Shepherd

2018
Champions:

 750 Formula – Mark Glover
 Armed Forces Race Challenge – Ed McKean
 Bikesports – Joe Stables
 Classic Stock Hatch – Lee Scott
 Clio 182 Championship – Patrick Fletcher
 Club Enduro – Matt Nossiter / Steve Hewson
 Formula Vee – Craig Pollard
 Hot Hatch – Michael Winkworth
 Locost – Mark Burton
 M3 Cup – Tom Coller
 MR2 Championship – Shaun Traynor
 MX5 Cup – Paul Maguire
 RGB Championship – Billy Albone
 Sports Specials – Lee Emm

2020
Champions:

 750 Formula – Peter Bove
 Alfa Romeo - Thomas Hill
 Bikesports – Charles Hall
 BMW Car Club Racing - Kevin Denwood
 Classic Stock Hatch – Pip Hammond
 Clio 182 Championship – Ryan Polley
 Club Enduro – Rob Baker / Carl Swfit
 F1000 - Dan Clewes
 Formula Vee – James Harridge
 Hot Hatch – David Drinkwater
 Locost – Murray Shepherd
 MR2 Championship – Aaron Cooke
 MX5 Cup – Ben Hancy
 S1000 - Ryan Yarrow
 Sports Specials – Andy Hiley

2021
Champions:

 750 Formula – Peter Bove
 Alfa Romeo - Barry McMahon
 Armed Forces Challenge - Jonathan Candler
 Bikesports – Leon Morrell
 BMW Car Club Racing - Ben Pearson
 Classic Stock Hatch – Ryan Morgan
 Clio 182 Championship – Jack Dwane
 Club Enduro – Rob Baker / Carl Swfit
 F1000 - Lee Morgan
 Formula Vee – James Harridge
 Hot Hatch – David Drinkwater
 Locost – Martin West
 Ma7da - Danny Andrew
 MR2 Championship – Aaron Cooke
 MX5 Cup – Ben Short
 S1000 - Ryan Yarrow
 Sports Specials – Andy Hiley
 Type R Trophy - Adam Shepherd

2022
Champions:

 750 Formula – Peter Bove
 Alfa Romeo - Andrew Bourke
 Armed Forces Challenge - Douglas Inglis
 Bikesports – Simon Walker-Hansell
 BMW Car Club Racing - Lee Piercey
 Classic Stock Hatch – Chris Dear
 Clio 182 Championship – Andrew Harding
 Club Enduro – Rob Baker / Carl Swfit
 F1000 - Robert Welham
 Formula Vee – Craig Pollard
 Hot Hatch – David Drinkwater
 Locost – Craig Land
 Ma7da - Jonathan Lisseter
 MR2 Championship – Aaron Cooke
 MX5 Cup – Ben Short
 S1000 - Richard Webb
 Sports Specials – Stuart Thompson
 Type R Trophy - Jake Hewlett

References

External links 
 750 Motor Club

Sports clubs in England
Motorsport organisations in the United Kingdom